Barry Norsworthy (16 October 1951 – 17 September 2021) was an Australian rules footballer who played for Central District in the South Australian National Football League (SANFL) and Melbourne in the Victorian Football League (VFL) during the late 1960s and 1970s.

Family
The son of Graham Ernest Norsworthy, and Marjorie June Norsworthy, née Hill,  Barry Graham Norsworthy was born at the Queen Victoria Maternity Hospital at Rose Park, South Australia on 16 October 1951.

Football
Barry Norsworthy, a rover, and the older brother of Mark Norsworthy, began his career in the South Australian National Football League (SANFL) in 1969 with Central District.

He won their 'best and fairest' award in 1975; and, in the same year, represented South Australia in interstate matches against Victoria and Tasmania.

After another 'best and fairest' the following season he transferred to the Melbourne Football Club, but had little success. He returned to Central District once his Melbourne stint was over and retired after playing 158 SANFL games.

Notes

References
 Holmesby, Russell and Main, Jim (2007). The Encyclopedia of AFL Footballers. 7th ed. Melbourne: Bas Publishing.
 The Club Mourns the Passing of 2-Time Best & Fairest Player: Barry Norsworthy, Central District Football Club News, 20 September 2021.

External links
 
 
 Barry Norsworthy, at Demonwiki.
 

1951 births
2021 deaths
Australian rules footballers from South Australia
Melbourne Football Club players
Central District Football Club players